Serhiy Starenkyi (born 20 September 1984) is a Ukrainian professional footballer who plays as a midfielder for Dinaz Vyshhorod.

Career
Starenkyi is a product of the youth systems of Chaika Vyshhorod and Dinaz Vyshhorod.

Desna Chernihiv
On 23 June 2018 he signed with Desna Chernihiv. In his third season with the club, he helped them qualify for the Europa League third qualifying round for the first time.

Dinaz Vyshhorod
On 16 January 2021, Starenkyi signed for Dinaz Vyshhorod in the Ukrainian Second League. On 19 March, he made his league debut for the club against Chaika. On 22 May, he scored his first goal for the club against Karpaty Lviv. 

In January 2022, while still under contract as a player, he became the director of the club.

Honours
Dinaz Vyshhorod
 Ukrainian Second League: Runner-Up 2020–21

Oleksandriya
 Ukrainian First League: 2014-15

Individual
 Top Scorer Ukrainian First League: Runner-Up 2013–14

References

External links
 
 
 
 

1984 births
Living people
Ukrainian footballers
Association football midfielders
Ukrainian expatriate footballers
Expatriate footballers in Belarus
Ukrainian expatriate sportspeople in Belarus
FC Torpedo-BelAZ Zhodino players
FC Smorgon players
FC Desna Chernihiv players
FC Lviv players
FC Arsenal Kyiv players
FC Oleksandriya players
FC Dinaz Vyshhorod players
Ukrainian Premier League players
Ukrainian First League players
Ukrainian Second League players
Sportspeople from Kyiv Oblast